SaypYu (originally SaypU) (acronym for "Spell As You Pronounce Universal alphabet project") is an approximative phonetic alphabet of 24 alphabet letters to spell languages, including English. The spelling system was adopted by Jaber George Jabbour to write English more phonetically. The 24-letter alphabet includes 23 Roman alphabet letters (after excluding "c", "q", and "x") and the addition of a 24th letter, the IPA letter "ɘ" (close-mid central unrounded vowel) to play the role of schwa. The letter represents the initial sound of "ago" or "about".

The SaypYu project promotes "the simple universal phonetic alphabet" which is intended to facilitate a quick and convenient writing system for verbally penetrating foreign situations and pronouncing unusual place-names reasonably quickly and accurately. The official website of the project has published thousands of words in amended phonetic system inviting others to make suggestions, additions, and corrections as a collaborative project.

SaypYu is not intended to replace, but to complement the highly sophisticated and elegant International Phonetic Alphabet (IPA) which is used in professional dictionaries. It currently borrows the "ɘ" directly from the IPA, but possibly this may be replaced by a * or @ for less sophisticated systems.

The system while based on phonetic alphabet, represents phonemics instead. Enough similar sounds, are written identically, as the th-sounds found in english are both spelt with th while IPA uses /θ/ in "this" and /ð/ in thin.

Origin
The Times Education Editor (Greg Hurst) reported in the article "Learning a new language? It's as easy as ABK!":

The project was launched on 10 December 2012 by Jaber George Jabbour, Director of the Logos Capital Ltd. (UK), who is of Syrian origin, widely travelled and has encountered difficulty pronouncing words spelt in conventional Roman text such as Leicester Square which becomes, in SaypYu: Lestɘr skwer. Its declared purpose is to make pronunciation easier and foster international understanding.

According to BBC Learning English project report by Karen Zarindast "Spell as you Pronounce" in the section Words in the News:

SaypYu Alphabet letters

IPA to SaypYu Map

 is spelled as simply tsh.

Criticism
The project was aired on Canadian national radio. The presenter Anna Maria Tremonti interviewed:

Dennis Baron, professor of English and linguistics at the University of Illinois, noted that a common linguistic understanding existed between the American colonists and the British authorities in 1773, and there have been numerous civil wars, such as that of 1861–1865, which have tended to be resolved not by talking, but by military force. He acknowledged the failure of Esperanto to gain adherents, but speculated that may be because of a cultural deficiency—while SaypYu sought to preserve existing linguistic cultures, much of English culture is bound up with its quirky spelling—in short, it needs to be expanded to be useful. He noted that a German president has suggested English should be an EU utility language.
Henry Hitchings, a British journalist and the author of The Language Wars: A History of Proper English, observed that there were numerous similar proposals, and that the IPA had identified 107 distinct sounds plus diacritics. Accordingly, he doubted that SaypYu could currently cope with tonal languages, but accepted that this may be addressed if the system develops. The limitations were too great for many languages. Many inventors of language and spelling systems were culturally detached from the reality of the incredible complexity and subtlety of human linguistic interaction.

See also
English-language spelling reform
Experimental phonetics
Index of phonetics articles
International Phonetic Alphabet
Phonemic orthography
Phonetic alphabet (disambiguation)
Spelling reform

References

External links
 (archived 2017-04-04)

English spelling reform
Nonstandard spelling
Phonetics
Writing systems introduced in 2012